Angier is a town in the Black River Township of Harnett County, North Carolina, United States. The population was 4,350 at the 2010 census and estimated as of 2018 to be 5,253. Angier is a part of the greater Raleigh–Durham–Cary Combined Statistical Area (CSA) as defined by the United States Census Bureau.

History
The Williams Grove School was listed on the National Register of Historic Places in 1995.

Geography
Angier is located in northern Harnett County at 35° 30’31" North, 78° 44’15" West (35.508587, -78.737487). A small portion of the town is in Wake County to the north. North Carolina Highway 55 (Raleigh Street) passes through the center of town, leading north  to Fuquay-Varina and south  to Erwin. North Carolina Highway 210 (Depot Street) crosses Highway 55 in the center of Angier, leading east  to Interstate 40 and southwest  to Lillington, the Harnett county seat.

Demographics

2020 census

As of the 2020 United States census, there were 5,265 people, 2,056 households, and 1,429 families residing in the town.

2000 census
As of the census of 2000, there were 3,419 people, 1,356 households, and 870 families residing in the town. The population density was 1,493.7 people per square mile (576.5/km2). There were 1,478 housing units at an average density of 645.7 per square mile (249.2/km2). The racial makeup of the town was 67.42% White, 23.37% African American, 0.41% Native American, 0.94% Asian, 0.03% Pacific Islander, 6.23% from other races, and 1.61% from two or more races. Hispanic or Latino of any race were 12.17% of the population.

There were 1,356 households, out of which 31.8% had children under the age of 18 living with them, 43.2% were married couples living together, 16.7% had a female householder with no husband present, and 35.8% were non-families. 28.3% of all households were made up of individuals, and 10.0% had someone living alone who was 65 years of age or older. The average household size was 2.46 and the average family size was 3.00.

In the town, the population was spread out, with 25.4% under the age of 18, 10.3% from 18 to 24, 32.5% from 25 to 44, 20.0% from 45 to 64, and 11.8% who were 65 years of age or older. The median age was 33 years. For every 100 females, there were 92.1 males. For every 100 females age 18 and over, there were 89.0 males.

The median income for a household in the town was $33,849, and the median income for a family was $43,784. Males had a median income of $30,215 versus $26,028 for females. The per capita income for the town was $15,985. About 10.6% of families and 16.3% of the population were below the poverty line, including 14.4% of those under age 18 and 30.4% of those age 65 or over.

Education
 Carolina Charter Academy
McGee's Crossroads Elementary School
 Angier Elementary School
 North Harnett Primary School
 Harnett Central Middle School
 Harnett Central High School

Culture
Angier annually hosts the "Crepe Myrtle Festival", which attracts approximately 20,000 visitors. The town calls itself "The Town of Crepe Myrtles". Each summer Angier draws a crowd of motorcyclists and bike enthusiasts from across the region to downtown Angier to enjoy the sights, sounds and tastes of its annual Bike Fest event. The family-friendly event features live music, a bike show, a poker-run fund-raiser, exhibits and fun for people of all ages.

Angier lies along the "Art Road and Farm Trail" through Bladen, Cumberland, Harnett, Johnston and Robeson counties.

Notable persons
 Franklin Dupree, federal judge
 Rhoda Griffis, actress
 Stephanie Patrick, YouTuber

References

External links
 Official website
 Angier Chamber of Commerce

Towns in Harnett County, North Carolina
Towns in North Carolina
Populated places established in 1901